Vijayanagarada Veeraputhra is a 1961 Indian Kannada-language film, directed and produced by R. Nagendra Rao. The film stars R. N. Sudarshan, B. Saroja Devi, R. Nagendra Rao and Kalyan Kumar in the lead roles. The film's musical score was composed by M. S. Viswanathan and T. K. Ramamurthy.

Although set in the backdrop of the Vijayanagara Empire at the close of the 15th century, the movie was wholly fictional and was more in the nature of a medieval action and revenge drama with intelligent doses of conspiracy, plotting, melodrama and old-style romance thrown in.

Cast

R. N. Sudarshan
B. Saroja Devi
R. Nagendra Rao
Kalyan Kumar
Udaykumar
Sandhya
Lakshmidevi
Ramadevi
Baby Lakshmi
Balakrishna
Narasimharaju
Ganapathi Bhat
H. R. Shastry
Shyamsundar
Hanumantha Rao
M. G. Mari Rao
Udayashankar
G. M. Nanjappa
Sando Prakash
Haneef Kumar
Shivaji Rao
Desharaj
Hanumanthachar
Guggu
Shankarnarayan
Maheshwaraiah
Gopal Rao
Shakunthala
Shashi
Kala
Mala
Leela
Janardhan

Soundtrack
The music was composed by Viswanathan–Ramamoorthy.

References

External links
 
 

1961 films
1960s Kannada-language films
Films scored by Viswanathan–Ramamoorthy
Films set in the Vijayanagara Empire